Proutiella esoterica is a moth of the family Notodontidae. It is only known from Ecuador.

The length of the forewings is about 15.5 mm

External links
Species page at Tree of Life project

Notodontidae of South America
Moths described in 1918